The Libyan Volleyball Federation (LVBF) is the governing body of volleyball in Libya. It was founded in 1964, affiliated to CAVB in 1968 and to AVA in 1975.

External links
LVBF profile - FIVB official website

Volleyball in Libya